The Herbert Onyewumbu Wigwe Foundation (HOW) is an Nigerian non-profit organization founded in 2016 by banker and entrepreneur Herbert O. Wigwe and headquartered in Lagos. Its CEO is Anthonia Ally.

History and objectives 
Herbert O. Wigwe founded the HOW Foundation in 2016 as a social enterprise. It focuses on youth empowerment through leadership and mentorship and on health, specifically malaria and prostate cancer.

Programs

Give Malaria No Place 
The Give Malaria No Place (GMNP) initiative with Doctors Save A Life Foundation includes education, rapid-response testing, and distribution of mosquito nets and medication to prevent and treat malaria.

Prostate cancer awareness 
Recognizing that prostate cancer is particularly common among Black men and that low awareness among Nigerians leads to its being diagnosed only when advanced, the foundation sponsored a charity football match to mark Prostate Cancer Awareness Month in September 2017.

Youth programmes 
The foundation finances leadership and mentorship seminars with U.K.-based motivational speaker Joshua Ajitena for students in government secondary schools, and awards prizes and scholarships to top students. The foundation is also a major sponsor of God's Children Great Talent, an annual gospel-focused talent contest for children and young people organized by the City of David parish of the Redeemed Christian Church of God.

Food distribution during COVID-19 lockdown
During the COVID-19 pandemic, the foundation distributed food and relief packages in Wigwe's hometown of Isiokpo and other communities in Rivers State, to alleviate the effects of lockdown and other restrictions.

References

External links 
 Official website

Non-profit organizations based in Lagos
Organizations established in 2016